The 1990 World Series Challenge was an invitational snooker tournament played in Hong Kong from 22 to 26 August 1990, organised by IMG. It featured seven of the top eight ranked players (John Parrott was the exception, being replaced by Steve James), two other professionals James Wattana and Franky Chan, and two amateurs. James Wattana won the title by beating Jimmy White 9–3 in the final.

It was the first event of the 1990–91 snooker season. James Wattana beat four of the top six ranked players on his way to winning the title. He also compiled the highest , 127, in the first  of his match against Steve Davis. The event was televised and attracted twenty million viewers in Thailand.

Prize Fund
The event was sponsored by 555 and had a total prize fund of £71,000 awarded as follows:
Winner: £20,000
Runner-up £10,000
Semi-finals: £7500
Quarter-finals £5,000
First round: £1,500

Main draw

References

1990 in snooker
1990 in Hong Kong sport
Sport in Hong Kong
1990